The 2014 South Carolina Gamecocks football team represented the University of South Carolina in the 2014 NCAA Division I FBS football season. The Gamecocks competed as a member of the Southeastern Conference (SEC) as part of its East Division. The team was led by head coach Steve Spurrier, in his tenth year, and played its home games at Williams-Brice Stadium in Columbia, South Carolina. They finished the season 7–6, 3–5 in SEC play to finish in fifth place in the East Division. They were invited to the Independence Bowl where they defeated Miami (FL).

Before the season

2014 recruiting class

National award watch lists
 Camp - Mike Davis
 Groza - Elliot Fry
 Hornung - Pharoh Cooper
 Lombardi - A.J. Cann
 Mackey - Rory Anderson
 Maxwell - Mike Davis
 Outland - A.J. Cann
 Outland - Corey Robinson
 Outland - Brandon Shell
 Rimington - Cody Waldrop
 Walker - Mike Davis

Preseason All-America
 OL A.J. Cann
 Phil Steele (1st team)
 RB Mike Davis
 Phil Steele (3rd team)

Preseason All-SEC
 OL A.J. Cann
 SEC Media (2nd team)
 Phil Steele (1st team)
 Athlon Magazine (1st team)
 RB Mike Davis
 SEC Media (2nd team)
 Phil Steele (2nd team)
 Athlon Magazine (2nd team)
 K Elliot Fry
 Athlon Magazine (3rd team)
 LB Skai Moore
 Athlon Magazine (3rd team)
 OL Corey Robinson
 SEC Media (2nd team)
 Athlon Magazine (3rd team)
 WR Shaq Roland
 Athlon Magazine (3rd team)
 DB Brison Williams
 SEC Media (2nd team)

Schedule

Source:

Roster

Source:

Depth chart
For:  8/28/14 (Texas A&M)

Game summaries

Texas A&M

The Gamecocks open the 2014 season with a Thursday night matchup against conference foe Texas A&M. It will be the first meeting between the two schools. With kickoff set for 6:00 PM EDT, this game was scheduled to be the first live football game broadcast on the SEC Network. As the first game of the Gamecocks-Aggies cross-division rivalry, the winner of this game will be awarded the new Bonham Trophy, named after Alamo war hero and South Carolina alumnus James Butler Bonham.

East Carolina

South Carolina hosts East Carolina for Week 2 of the college football season. The Gamecocks hold a 12-5 all-time series record against the Pirates. South Carolina won the most recent matchup in 2012 by a score of 48-10. It was the first career start for then-backup QB Dylan Thompson, who threw for 330 yards with 3 touchdowns and no interceptions in the victory.

Georgia

The SEC East rival Georgia Bulldogs visit South Carolina on September 13, 2014 to conclude the Gamecocks three-game homestand. Georgia leads the all-time series 48-17-2; however, the Gamecocks have won three of the last four matchups, including a dominating 35-7 victory in the last meeting at Williams-Brice Stadium. The Bulldogs won last year’s matchup 41-30 in Athens, Georgia behind a 4 touchdown performance by Aaron Murray.

Vanderbilt

South Carolina travels to Vanderbilt for the first road game of the 2014 season. South Carolina holds a 19-4 all-time series record against the Commodores, and has won the last five meetings.

Missouri

The Gamecocks host the defending SEC East division champion Missouri Tigers for the 2014 Battle of Columbia. The all-time series record is tied at two wins apiece. South Carolina, however, has won both meetings since Missouri joined the SEC in 2012. Last year’s meeting saw Gamecocks QB Connor Shaw lead a 17-point, fourth quarter comeback in Columbia, Missouri to send the game into overtime. The Gamecocks would go on to win in double overtime, becoming the only team to defeat the Tigers in the regular season. The winner of this game receives the Mayors’ Cup Trophy.

Kentucky

South Carolina’s second road test of the season takes place in Lexington, Kentucky against SEC East foe Kentucky. South Carolina leads the all-time series 17-7-1. The Gamecocks have won the last three meetings, including last year’s 35-28 win at home.

Furman

In-state FCS team Furman comes to Columbia in Week 8 with the Gamecocks coming off of a bye week.

Auburn

South Carolina visits the defending SEC champion Auburn Tigers on October 25, 2014. Auburn leads the all-time series 9-1-1. Auburn has won all seven matchups since South Carolina joined the SEC in 1992, including the 2010 SEC Championship Game.

Tennessee

The Gamecocks host SEC East rival Tennessee for the ninth game of the 2014 season. Tennessee leads the all-time series 23-7-2, but South Carolina has won three of the last four meetings. South Carolina will look to avenge last year’s matchup in Knoxville, Tennessee when the Volunteers handed the Gamecocks their second and final loss of the 2013 season, made possible by a one-handed catch by WR Marquez North to set up a game-winning field goal. The loss eventually cost South Carolina the SEC Eastern Division title and a trip to the SEC Championship game.

Florida

South Carolina comes off their second bye week with a trip to Gainesville, Florida to take on the Florida Gators in the final SEC game of the season. The Gators lead the all-time series 24-7-3; however, the Gamecocks have won three of the last four meetings. Four of the Gamecocks’ seven wins against Florida have come since Gator legend Steve Spurrier took over as head coach in 2005. South Carolina’s last win in Gainesville took place in 2010 in a game that clinched the Gamecocks’ first SEC East division title.

South Alabama

South Carolina hosts its final home game of the 2014 season against the South Alabama Jaguars. It will be the first meeting between the two schools.

Clemson

South Carolina travels to Clemson, South Carolina for the 112th Battle of the Palmetto State. Clemson leads the all-time series 65-42-4; however, South Carolina has controlled the heated rivalry series as of late, winning the last five meetings by an average margin of 16.8 points. The Gamecocks’ five game winning streak is Carolina's longest winning streak in the series. Steve Spurrier is 6-3 against the Tigers since taking over as head coach in 2005. Gamecock QB Dylan Thompson made his second career start in the last matchup at Memorial Stadium, replacing injured QB Connor Shaw.  Thompson threw for 249 yards with 1 touchdown in the 35-17 loss to the Tigers.

Rankings

References

South Carolina
South Carolina Gamecocks football seasons
Independence Bowl champion seasons
South Carolina Gamecocks football